The second season of The Voice, the Indian reality talent show, premiered on 10 December 2016 and concluded on 12 March 2017, with Farhan Sabir being crowned as the winner. The reality series is produced by Urban Brew Studios for &TV.

Coaches and hosts
Shaan was announced as returning coach; Neeti Mohan, Salim Merchant and Benny Dayal joined Shaan. Karan Tacker was replaced by Gunjan Utreja as the host of the season. Sugandha Mishra joined Utreja as the co-host.

Series overview

Each coach was allowed to advance three top to the live shows:

Teams
Color key

Episode 28: 12 March 2017 (Grand Finale)

Key
 Winner
 Runner-up
 Third place
 Fourth place

Competition performances

References

External links
 

The Voice (Indian TV series)
2016 Indian television seasons
2017 Indian television seasons